Malbec is a Los Angeles-based indie rock band, formed in 2003. Malbec was noted as on the forefront of bands which integrated sequenced hip-hop beats with modern pop stylings; their musical style includes influences from Southern hip hop, Britpop, classical compositions and folk music.

Malbec disbanded in 2010 and notably began the music careers of Foster the People drummer Mark Pontius, hip-hop producer Speakerbomb (Freddie Gibbs), pop songwriter and producer Nick Ruth (Zara Larsson, Kelly Clarkson, Night Terrors of 1927), among others. Members Samantha Barbera and Ruth would go on to form Beginners in 2014.

History 
Malbec began in 2003 and officially formed in early 2004 in Los Angeles, California. Malbec was made of friends Pablo Signori, Nick Ruth, and Sam Barbera, who met at Indiana University, in addition to Sid Miller and Mark Pontius. Their name is nod to frontman Pablo Signori's family origin in Argentina. Malbec self-released their debut EP Malbec in February 2005, produced by Tony Fagenson. They released their sophomore EP in April 2006. This record, Keep It A Secret, was produced by Richard Gibbs and Rick Parker.

In 2007, they signed a publishing deal with Songs Music Publishing and were heard on a number of television shows and movie soundtracks, including One Tree Hill, Flight of the Phoenix, Long Way Round, The Omen, Palo Alto and in the episode "Chuck vs. the Colonel" in NBC's Chuck. They are also featured on Fox's show VIP Passport, Kyle XY, Dirty Sexy Money, My Best Friend's Girl. They have also had placements in MTV's 16 & Pregnant, Teen Mom, and Teen Mom 2, as well as ABC Family's 2011 show, The Lying Game. Malbec also recorded "Given the Times" in Simlish for the 2007 Electronic Arts game The Sims: Pet Stories 2.

Malbec released their self-produced full-length debut album Dawn of Our Age in March 2008. From December 2008 to April 2009, Malbec released a series of five EPs in five months, called the Answering Machine EPs. They wrote, recorded and released a new EP every month. In 2012, the EPs were released as a sixteen-track album.

Malbec toured with Mutemath, Mat Kearney, OneRepublic, Under the Influence of Giants, Phantom Planet, Rock Kills Kid, Copeland, The Knux, and Tally Hall.

In December 2009, Malbec parted ways with their original drummer, Mark Pontius, who left to found the indie pop band Foster the People. The rest of the band remained together and worked on new music, including two collaborations with The Knux, "F@&k You" and "Fruits." They disbanded in 2010 and released an EP of unreleased material Last Dance in December 2011.

Members and instruments
Pablo Signori – vocals, piano, guitar
Samantha Barbera – bass guitar, backing vocalist
Nick Ruth – guitar, backing vocals
Sidney Miller – keyboards, programming
Mark Pontius – drums

Discography
Malbec EP (2006) via Double O Buffalo

Keep It A Secret EP (2007) via Double O Buffalo

Dawn Of Our Age (2008) via Double O BuffaloAnswering Machine EP #1 (2008) via Double O BuffaloAnswering Machine EP #2 (2009) via Double O Buffalo

Answering Machine EP #3 (2009) via Double O Buffalo

''Answering Machine EP #4 (2009) via Double O BuffaloAnswering Machine EP #5 (2009) via Double O BuffaloLast Dance'' EP (2011)

References

External links
Official Website
CdBaby profile

Musical groups established in 2003